Shahr Khodro Football Club (Bashgah-e Futbal-e Shahr Xodro), previously known as Padideh, is an Iranian football club based in Mashhad, Razavi Khorasan, that competes in the Persian Gulf Pro League. The club was founded in 2013 and was known as Padideh Khorasan Football Club (Bashgah-e Futbal-e Padide Xorasan) between 2013 and 2019, and between March and August 2021.

The football team plays its home games at the Imam Reza Stadium which has a seating capacity of 27,700. The club is owned and supported by the Shahr Khodro Company.

History

Mes Sarcheshmeh years

Azadegan League
Mes Sarcheshmeh was owned by Kerman's largest Copper producer "Sanate Mes Kerman", the same company that owned Mes Kerman. Mes Sarcheshmeh was founded in 1998 together with several other clubs by the Copper company of Kerman. In the past four years, the club has experienced enormous success as they have claimed promotion twice during this period.

After a third-place finish in the 2007–2008 season, they gained promotion the following year, finishing in first place. While being tipped as favourites for the drop, they beat the odds and finished in a respectable fifth spot.  The following season proved to be their last, in the Azadegan League 1 as they won the league due to their better goal difference compared to runners up Aluminium Hormozgan. This meant that Mes Sarcheshme had been promoted to the Iranian Premier League for the first time.

Promotion to the Iran Pro League
Mes Sarcheshme was the second team owned by "Sanat Mes Kerman" to have reached the Premier League, the other team is Mes Kerman. Mes Sarcheshme could not make an impact in the IPL and were relegated. In July 2013, the club was moved from Kerman to Mashhad and renamed to Padideh Shandiz for two seasons.

Padideh Shandiz
When 2012–13 season ended, Mes Sarcheshmeh had given up from administrating a professional football club. They sold their football club to Padideh Shandiz as of July 2013. New owners moved the club to Mashhad and introduced Akbar Misaghian as club boss. Padideh was promoted to the Persian Gulf Pro League in the following season, and were crowned champions of the Azadegan League, after beating Naft Masjed Soleyman 1–0 in the final. Before their first season in the Iran Pro League, Padideh made several big name signings, namely Reza Enayati and Milan Jovanović. Padideh made the semi–final of the 2014–15 Hazfi Cup but lost to Naft Tehran on penalties.

Shahr Khodro defeated Qatar's Al Sailiya FC 5–4 in a penalty shootout after a scoreless draw at the Abdullah Bin Khalifa Stadium on Tuesday to secure a place at 2020 ACL for the first time in history. Shahr Khodro became the 13th club from Iran to reach the group stage.

Logo, color and kit

Logo 
Shahr Khodro Football Club has a red and yellow logo with the image of a cheetah on it;  The main color of the logo is red and the football ball symbol at the bottom of the cheetah image also indicates the importance of football and the main discipline of the club.

Color 
Shahr Khodro is generally known for its red color;  This color is also used in the logo and the shirt.

Kit 
The first kit of this team is red and the second kit is usually white.

Stadium

They currently play at Imam Reza Stadium. The stadium is in an area of Mashhad that belongs to the Astan Quds Razavi (AQR), a charitable foundation which manages the Imam Reza shrine. The stadium is located in the eastern side of the  AQR Sports Complex and has a  area. In addition to the football stadium, the complex has ten sport salons including tennis, basketball and volleyball arenas, swimming pools and water collection. The complex also has amphitheater, conference hall, dining hall, museum and coaching classes.

Rivals
The Mashhad derby also known as the Razavi Khorasan derby is a football local derby match between the four most popular clubs from Mashhad: Aboomoslem and Payam and Siah Jamegan and Padideh.  Back in the 1980s and early 1990s was Iran's second most important derby after the Tehran derby. Nowadays it has lost its status to more popular derbies such as Isfahan derby, Ahvaz derby, Tabriz derby, Guilan derby, Shiraz derby and Mazandaran derby.

Players

First-team squad

Officials

Managers

Coaching staff

Players on international cups
Players who were a member of their national team at International Competitions while playing for Shahr Khodro FC.

Honours
Azadegan League:
Winners (1): 2013–14

Continental record

References

External links
Official club website
Official Shahr Khodro Fans page

 
Football clubs in Iran
Sport in Mashhad
2013 establishments in Iran
Association football clubs established in 2013